Basketball at the 2019 Military World Games was held in Wuhan, China from 19 to 25 October 2019.

Medal summary

Results

Medal table

References

External links
Basketball tournament of the 7th Military World Games - Official website of the 2019 Military World Games

Basketball
2019